Gerald Lynn Watkins (born December 8, 1954, in Paducah, Kentucky) is a U.S. politician and a Democratic member of the Kentucky House of Representatives representing District 3 since January 8, 2013.

Education
Watkins earned his AA from Paducah Community College (now the West Kentucky Community and Technical College), and his BS in business administration and MBA from Murray State University.

Elections
2012 Redistricted to District 3, with Representative David Housman leaving the Legislature, Watkins was unopposed for the May 22, 2012 Democratic Primary and won the November 6, 2012 General election with 9,349 votes (59.3%) against Republican nominee Jason Crockett.
1992 Initially in District 4, Watkins ran in the three-way May 26, 1992 Democratic Primary but lost to Frank Rasche.
1998 When Representative Kathy Hogancamp ran for Kentucky Senate and left the seat open, Watkins ran in the three-way 1998 Democratic Primary, but lost to Michael Cherry, who went on to win the November 3, 1998 General election against Republican nominee Sandra Furjanic.

References

External links
Official page at the Kentucky General Assembly

Gerald Watkins at Ballotpedia
Gerald Watkins at the National Institute on Money in State Politics

1954 births
Living people
Democratic Party members of the Kentucky House of Representatives
Murray State University alumni
People from Paducah, Kentucky
21st-century American politicians